Bo Shek Mansion is a Flat-for-Sale Scheme public housing estate in Tsuen Wan, New Territories, Hong Kong located at the reclaimed land in Sha Tsui Road. It now consists of 3 residential buildings, built in 1996 by Hong Kong Housing Society. It, in total, offers 268 units for rental use and 400 units for the Flat-for-Sale Scheme. Its name in Chinese, literally "Precious Stones Estate" in English, was derived from the nearby Shek Pik San Tsuen (the character 石 means "stone"). The original estate was demolished in 1992, and 3 buildings, which stand today, were rebuilt at the site in 1996.

Background
Prior to the redevelopment in 1996, the English name for the estate was "Bo Shek Dai Ha", completely transliterated from the Chinese pronunciation. However, it was renamed Bo Shek Mansion afterwards.

Houses

Politics
Bo Shek Mansion is located in Yeung Uk Road constituency of the Tsuen Wan District Council. It is currently represented by Steven Lam Sek-tim, who was elected in the 2019 elections.

See also

Public housing estates in Tsuen Wan

References

Buildings and structures completed in 1964
Buildings and structures completed in 1966
Tsuen Wan
Public housing estates in Hong Kong
Flat-for-Sale Scheme